Alireza Soleimani (also Romanized as "Alīrezā Soleimānī"; born 17 February 1996) is an Iranian weightlifter who won the silver medal in the Men's +94 kg weight class at the 2013 World Youth Weightlifting Championships.

Major results

References

External links
 
 

1996 births
Living people
Iranian male weightlifters
Iranian strength athletes
21st-century Iranian people